This is a list of notable people from St. John's, Newfoundland and Labrador. Although not everyone in this list was born in St. John's, they all live or have lived in St. John's and have had significant connections to the community.

A
 Luke Adam, ice hockey player for the Adler Mannheim of the Deutsche Eishockey Liga (DEL)
 Frederick C. Alderdice, businessman and politician
 John Anderson, politician
 John Murray Anderson, director, producer, songwriter and author
 Ralph LeMoine Andrews, recipient of the Order of Canada
 Scott Andrews, politician
 John Bartlett Angel, recipient of the Order of Canada
 Lewis H.M. Ayre, businessman

B
 Cathy Bennett, politician
 George John Bond, Methodist minister
 Tim Baker, singer
 Robert Bond, politician
 Charles R. Bowring, merchant and politician
 Edgar Rennie Bowring, businessman and politician
 Dana Bradley, student, murder victim
 Frederick Gordon Bradley, politician
 Donald Brian, actor, dancer, and singer
 Cyprian Bridge, British Royal Navy officer
 Petrina Bromley, Broadway actress, Come from Away
 Harry Brown, journalist
 Vincent P. Bryan, composer and lyricist
 Ed Buckingham, politician
 Dean Burry, composer, librettist, and educator

C
 William Aquin Carew, prelate
 Frederick Carter, lawyer and politician
 Sean Casey, politician
 Bill Clark, writer
 Ryan Cleary, politician and journalist
 Al Clouston, storyteller and humorist
 Ryane Clowe, National Hockey League player
 Anne Chislett, playwright
 William Coaker, politician
 Bob Cole, sportscaster
 Henry Collingwood, businessman and recipient of the Knight's Cross of Royal Order of St. Olav
 Richard Collins, actor
 Eric Cook, politician
 Gordon S. Cowan, politician and judge
 Mark Critch, comedian
 Chesley Crosbie, businessman and politician
 John Crosbie, former politician
 Dan Crummell, politician
 Michael Crummey, author

D
 Mary Dalton, poet
 Edward Henry Davey, architect and politician
 Tom Dawe, poet
 Dax, rapper
 Anne Marie DeLuise, actress
 William Denning, merchant and legislator
 Ethel Dickenson, educator and nurse
 Molly Dingle, educator
 Craig Dobbin, industrialist
 Dermot Dobbin, businessman
 Clive Doucet, writer and politician
 Brian Downey, actor
 Harold Druken, National Hockey League player
 William Duane, journalist and newspaper publisher
 Margaret Duley, novelist
 Brian Joseph Dunn, Roman Catholic bishop
 Gwynne Dyer, journalist

E
 Carl English, professional basketball player

F
 Edward Feild, bishop
 Charles Philip Fenwick, Canadian Surgeon General
 Grunia Movschovitch Ferman, entrepreneur, activist
 David Ferry, actor
 Michael Anthony Fleming, Catholic bishop
 James Patrick Fox, politician
 Andrew Furey, politician
 George Furey, senator

G
 Armine Nutting Gosling, suffragette
 Moya Greene, civil servant and businesswoman
 Colin Greening, National Hockey League player

H
 Edward Haliburton, politician
 Ralph Hamelmann, songwriter, professor, columnist, cartoonist, and television producer
 Tom Harrington, journalist
 Jack Harris, politician
 Peter Hart, historian
 Don Harvey, bishop
 Moses Harvey, clergyman, essayist, and naturalist
 Allan Hawco, actor
 Bonnie Hickey, politician
 William Hogan, politician
 James Patrick Howley, naturalist and geologist
 Hugh Hoyles, politician and lawyer
 Charles H. Hutchings, politician and lawyer

J
 Don Jamieson, politician
 Percy Janes, writer
 Robert Brown Job, businessman and politician
 Don Johnson, president of the Canadian Amateur Hockey Association and a Newfoundland sports executive
 Paul Johnson, philanthropist
 Cathy Jones, writer and comedian

K
 William Keen, former judicial officer
 Tom Kennedy, journalist
 Susan Kent, actress
 Thomas Kersey, sailor
 Dale Kirby, politician and university professor
 Mary Bernard Kirwan, teacher

L
 Raymond Lahey, Catholic bishop
 Paul Lane, politician
 Zebulon Aiton Lash, lawyer, civil servant, and businessman
 Walter Learning, theatre director and actor
 Mary Lewis, actress and filmmaker

M
 George MacDonnell, officer in the British Army in the War of 1812
 William D. MacGillivray, director
 Francis MacKenzie, politician
 Fannie Knowling McNeil, suffragette and artist
 Campbell Leonard Macpherson, businessman
 Cluny MacPherson, physician and the inventor of the gas mask
 Greg Malone, actor
 Earle McCurdy, labour leader
 Patrick Thomas McGrath, journalist and politician
 Thomas Meagher, merchant
 Thomas Meagher, MP
 Rick Mercer, television show host, comedian
 Lorraine Michael, politician
 Arthur William Miller, politician
 Harold Mitchell, politician
 Mary Xavier Molony, Presentation Sister who was the first nun to establish Catholic schools in Newfoundland
 Lisa Moore, author
 Jason Morgan, National Hockey League player
 Francis Morris, solicitor and politician
 John T. Mullock, Catholic bishop
 George Murphy, politician
 George Murray, poet

N
 Alex Newhook, National Hockey League player
 Dave Nicol, singer-songwriter
 Dwayne Norris, National Hockey League player
 Warren Norris, American Hockey League player

O
 Scott Oake, sportscaster
 Doug O'Brien, National Hockey League player
 Mark O'Brien, actor
 Fabian O'Dea, lawyer
 Deborah Odell, actress
 James Louis O'Donel, first Roman Catholic bishop of St. John's
 Johnathan Ogden, surgeon
 Seamus O'Regan, news reporter
 Tom Osborne, politician
 John Ottenheimer, lawyer and politician
 Joseph Outerbridge, businessman and philanthropist
 Sir Leonard Cecil Outerbridge, businessman and philanthropist

P
 Alyssa Nicole Pallett, model, actress, and businesswoman
 William Parker, builder
 Helen Parsons Shepherd, artist
 Jean Payne, businesswoman
 Krystin Pellerin, actress
 Rae Perlin, artist
 Vera Perlin, businesswoman
 William Petten, politician
 Robert Pilot, artist
 Cyprian Pinkham, bishop
 Al Pittman, poet and playwright
 Eleanor Power, first English woman to be executed in what is today Canada
 Sarah Power, actress
 Thomas Joseph Power, Catholic bishop
 Craig Francis Power, writer
 Tom Power, broadcaster and musician
 Christopher Pratt, painter
 Teddy Purcell, National Hockey League player

R
 Christopher Ralph, actor
 Gerry Rogers, filmmaker and politician
Isabella Whiteford Rogerson, poet, philanthropist
 Mark Rudkin, member of the British Army
 Frederick Russell, businessman
 John Ryan, printer
 Terry Ryan, National Hockey League player

S
 Louise Saunders, lawyer
 Tommy Sexton, comedian
 Jagmeet Singh, politician, leader of the New Democratic Party
 Thomas Skinner, Ceylon
 John Slaney, National Hockey League player
 Sebastian Spence, actor
 Helena Squires, politician
 Anthony Stack, deputy commander of the 5th Canadian Division
 Geoff Stirling, businessman
 Kim Stockwood, musician

T
 William Bevil Thomas, merchant, land developer, and sea captain
 Greg Thomey, actor
 Sara Tilley, writer
Mary Widdicombe Travers, hotelier and historical figure
 James Tuck, archaeologist
Otto Tucker, author, educator
 Paul Tucker, artist
 Zachary Turner, boy killed by his mother, Shirley Jane Turner, in a murder-suicide on 18 August 2003
 Shannon Tweed, actress
 Tracy Tweed, actress

W
 Mary Walsh, actress
 Mike Watson, poker player
 David Wells, politician
 Ed White, professional wrestler
 Alonza J. White, lawyer and politician
 Danny Williams, politician
 Harold Williams, geologist
 Neil Windsor, politician
 Jacqueline Winsor, sculptor
 Michael Winter, author

Y
 Andrew Younghusband, television personality, writer and journalist

See also
 List of people from Newfoundland and Labrador

References

St. John's
St. John's